The Strongylocentrotidae are a family of sea urchins in the order Echinoida.

Genera

References